Hypsopygia costaeguttalis is a species of snout moth in the genus Hypsopygia. It was described by Aristide Caradja in 1933. It is found in China.

References

Moths described in 1933
Pyralini
Taxa named by Aristide Caradja